Whale is an English surname of unclear origin; however, it could be a derivation of Walh, a word generally used by Anglo-Saxon colonists to refer to native Britons, Romans or Celts after the Anglo-Saxon conquest of England.  The Avebury stone circle, in Wiltshire, itself was referred to as waledich in the 13th century, a name still in use, as walldich, as late as 1696. Waledich literally means 'ditch of the wealas'. 

According to the 1841 census of England, there are three main pockets of the surname; Avebury in Wiltshire, Southampton in Hampshire, and Dudley, then in Worcestershire.

Notable people with the surname include:

 George Whale (1842–1910), English locomotive engineer
 James Whale (1889–1957), English film director, theatre director and actor
 James Whale (radio) (born 1951), English broadcaster for radio and television
 Robert R. Whale (1805–1887), English/Canadian painter

See also
 Whaler (surname)
 Whaley (surname)

References